I. montana may refer to:

Ilex montana, mountain winterberry
Iolaus montana, a butterfly of the family Lycaenidae
Isonandra montana, a small tree of the family Sapotaceae